The Battle of Villaviciosa (11 December 1710) was a battle between a Franco-Spanish army led by Louis Joseph, Duke of Vendôme and Philip V of Spain and a Habsburg-allied army commanded by Austrian Guido Starhemberg. The battle took place during the War of the Spanish Succession, one day after a Franco-Spanish victory at Brihuega against the British army under James Stanhope. Both Philip V of Spain and the Archduke Charles of Austria claimed victory, but the number of dead and wounded, the number of artillery and other weapons abandoned by the Allied army and the battle's strategic consequences for the war confirmed victory for Philip.

The battle was largely determined by the Spanish dragoons commanded by the Marquis of Valdecañas and the Count of Aguilar, which far exceeded the opposing forces. The Austrian forces retreated, pursued by Spanish cavalry, and the allied army was reduced to 6,000 or 7,000 men when it reached Barcelona (one of the few places in Spain still recognizing Charles' authority) on 6 January.

Prelude
After victories in the 27 July Battle of Almenara and the 20 August Battle of Saragossa, the Habsburg allies supporting Archduke Charles captured Madrid for the second time and Charles entered Madrid on 21 September. The 1710 invasion was a repetition of the one in 1706, and the 23,000-strong allied army was reduced at Almenara and Saragossa and in skirmishes with the Spanish-Bourbon militia. The allied troops were unable to maintain an occupation.

The allied position in Madrid was dangerous. On 9 November the city was evacuated and the retreat to Catalonia began, pursued by Spanish cavalry led by the Marquis of Valdecañas. The archduke left the army with 2,000 cavalry and rushed back to Barcelona, while the rest of the army marched in two detachments. Austrian general Starhemberg and the main body of 12,000 men were a day's march ahead of the 5,000 British troops under Lord Stanhope. The British force, surprised, was defeated at Brihuega on 9 December 1710. The British were taken prisoner (including Stanhope, who finally surrendered).

When General Starhemberg was informed of the attack on the British column he moved his troops to help Stanhope's army, unaware that the latter had capitulated. The next morning (December 10), the Franco-Spanish army was waiting on the plain of Villaviciosa. Compared to the Austrian general's 14,000 troops, the Duke of Vendome deployed about 20,000 men (including King Philip and other troops who had joined the duke that morning. The armies deployed in two lines (the custom of the time) on parallel ridges.

Bourbon deployment

First line

Right wing
Commander: Marquis of Valdecañas (Philip V of Spain participated in the battle in the cavalry squadrons of the right wing).

Cavalry squadrons:
 Dragoons of Caylus
 Dragoons of Vallejo (three squadrons)
 Dragoons of Osuna
 Guards of corps (four squadrons)
 Old Granada
 Piñateli
 Old order (four squadrons)

Center
Commander: Count of Torres

Infantry battalions:
Spanish guards (three battalions)
Walloon guards (three battalions)
Comesfort (one battalion)
Castellar (one battalion)
Gueldres (one battalion)
Benmel (one battalion)
Santal of Gende (one battalion)
Armada (one battalion)
Lombardy (one battalion)
Milan (one battalion)
Uribe (one battalion)
Mulfeta (one battalion)

Left wing

Commander: Count of Aguilar (the future Duke of Montemar participated in the battle under the Count of Aguilar as field marshal).

Cavalry squadrons:
Dragoons of Marimon
Dragoons of Quimalol
Dragoons of Grinao
Old Santiago
Bargas
Reina (four squadrons)

Second line

Right wing
Commander: Count of Merode (subordinate to the Marquis of Valdecañas)

Cavalry squadrons:
Asturias (four squadrons)
Muerte
Pozoblanco (four squadrons)
Estrella
Lanzarote (three squadrons)
Extremadura (three squadrons)

Center
Commander: Lieutenant-General Pedro de Zúñiga

Infantry battalions:
Castile (one battalion)
Murcia (one battalion)
Trujillo (one battalion)
Savoy (one battalion)
Écija (one battalion)
Naples Sea (one battalion)
Extremadura (one battalion)
Toledo (one battalion)
Sicily (one battalion)
Coria (one battalion)
León (one battalion)
Vitoria (one battalion)
Segovia (two battalions)
Naples (one battalion)

Left wing
Commander: Lieutenant-General Navamorquende (under the Count of Aguilar)

Cavalry squadrons:
New Roussillon (four squadrons)
New Granada
Velasco
Carvajal
Cavalry of Raja
Cavalry of Jaén
Old Roussillon (four squadrons)

Artillery
Commander: Marquis of Canales (23 pieces)

Battle
The battle began during the afternoon, lasting until midnight. Each army had 23 pieces of artillery, deployed in three batteries. The artillery fire began simultaneously, damaging both armies. The Marquis de Valdecañas, commanding the cavalry in the Bourbon right wing (with King Philip), began the attack. Valdecañas sent his cavalry against the allied left wing, composed of German infantry and Portuguese and Spanish cavalry under Imperial General von Frankenberg. The German infantry and Portuguese cavalry tried to stop the Bourbon charge before yielding, and the left wing was destroyed. The Spanish captured the artillery pieces, killing the Anglo-Dutch troops sent to aid the left wing. With the allied left wing defeated, the archduke's infantry advanced toward the Franco-Spanish center and drove back the Bourbon infantry. The Marquis of Toy tried to prevent losses in the center and avoid the division of the army, but most of his men were taken prisoner by the Portuguese.

Although the Bourbons in the center were in difficulty, the Count of Aguilar threw his cavalry against the archduke's right wing (commanded by General Starhemberg and comprising the best grenadiers and cavalry squadrons of the allied army). The allies were unable to stop the Count of Aguilar's cavalry. The archduke's right wing was saved from disaster by support from the center, led by the Spanish general Villarroel. Starhemberg regrouped his forces, repulsed the Count of Aguilar's cavalry and charged the Bourbon left wing. After capturing the left-wing cannons, Starhemberg launched his army against the center.

The Bourbon center and left wing began to retreat, and the right-wing cavalry pursued the allied left wing. The Count of Aguilar then attacked against the archduke's right wing with his dragoons. Although the German and Portuguese cavalry (under the Count of Atalaya) resisted the first charge, Aguilar's cavalry broke the allied right wing. Valdecañas' cavalry also dealt a severe blow to allied army, and Lt. Gen. Mahony and Field Marshal Amezaga's troops charged from the right wing. Starhemberg in return launched three cavalry charges against them. During the fighting, Amezaga was wounded in the face. Starhemberg's forces retreated to a nearby forest to escape the Franco-Spanish cavalry, and the allied forces began their withdrawal under cover of night. The British regiments suffered heavy losses; Brigadier-General Lepell, the senior British officer, reported two regiments had been cut off while over 107 men were missing from his own and he had only two squadrons still available.

Result

Although Philip V of Spain and the Archduke Charles both claimed victory, the number of dead and wounded, the weapons abandoned by the allied army, and the strategic consequences in the war confirmed French domination.

Starhemberg continued his retreat, harassed by Spanish cavalry. His army was reduced to 6,000 or 7,000 men when he reached Barcelona. The Spanish throne was finally secured for Philip when Charles left Spain in April 1711 to become Holy Roman Emperor after the death of his older brother.

References

Sources
Albi, Julio (1992). La Caballería Española: Un Eco de Clarines  Madrid: Tabapress S.A.

Frey, Linda and Marsha (1995). The Treaties of the War of the Spanish Succession. Greenwood Publishing Group. .
Herrero, Mª Dolores (1994). La Artilería Española, al pie de los cañones. Madrid: Tabapress S.A. Madrid.
Kamen, Henry (2000). Felipe V, el Rey que reinó dos veces.  Madrid: Ediciones Temas de Hoy S.A. Colección: Historia.

General references
Mckay, Derek 1983). The Rise of the Great Powers (1648-1815). New York: Longman. .
Stanhope, Philip Henry (1832). History of the War of the Succession in Spain. London: John Murray.
Symcox, Geoffrey (1973). War, Diplomacy, and Imperialism (1618–1763). New York: Harper Torchbooks. .

External links
Tricentenary celebration in 2010 (Spanish)

Conflicts in 1710
Villaviciosa
Villaviciosa
Villaviciosa
Villaviciosa
Villaviciosa
Villaviciosa
Villaviciosa
Villaviciosa
1710 in France
1710 in Spain
History of the province of Guadalajara